Lynn Arlen Stalmaster (November 17, 1927 – February 12, 2021) was an American casting director.  He was noted as the first casting director to be conferred an Academy Award, having received an Honorary Oscar in 2016.

Early life
Stalmaster was born in Omaha, Nebraska, on November 17, 1927. He was the son of Estelle (Lapidus) and Irvin A. Stalmaster, a lawyer who became a judge. Irvin was the first Jew, as well as the youngest person, to be appointed to a Nebraska district judgeship.  He was also active in the local Jewish community, serving as president of the Omaha B'nai B'rith. Lynn Stalmaster's younger brother is actor Hal Stalmaster (born 1940), best known for his starring role in the Disney film Johnny Tremain.

Stalmaster initially attended Dundee Elementary School in Omaha's Dundee–Happy Hollow Historic District.  In order to ameliorate his severe asthma, his family later relocated to Beverly Hills, California, where he attended Beverly Hills High School.  There he overcame his shyness by immersing himself in theatre and radio.  After serving in the U.S. Army, he studied theater arts at the UCLA School of Theater, Film and Television, obtaining a Master of Arts in 1952.

Career
Stalmaster got his first job in show business as an actor, appearing in the war movies The Steel Helmet (1951), The Flying Leathernecks (1951), and the TV series Big Town.  As a fail-safe plan, he was employed by Grosse-Krasne as a production assistant.  He subsequently became casting director after the incumbent retired, and went on to cast five on-air series.

After several years in that capacity, Stalmaster became an independent casting director. He established himself quickly as a solid casting director, finding steady work in both television and motion pictures. He was credited with casting more than 60 movies of the decade, among them; Fiddler on the Roof, Harold and Maude, The Cowboys, Deliverance, Rollerball, Silver Streak, Black Sunday, Coming Home, Convoy, The Rose, Superman and Being There.

Stalmaster was responsible for casting TV shows such as Gunsmoke, The Untouchables, and My Favorite Martian. He was also a part of Academy Award winning movies such as In the Heat of the Night, The Thomas Crown Affair, The Right Stuff, and Brian De Palma's The Untouchables.

Stalmaster was the first casting director to receive credit on a separate card in the main titles of a feature film, starting with The Thomas Crown Affair in 1968.  His name subsequently appeared in the main titles of over 180 films, credited as "Casting by Lynn Stalmaster."

Later life
Stalmaster was conferred the Career Achievement Award by the Casting Society of America (CSA) in 2003.  Thirteen years later, in November 2016, he received an Academy Honorary Award from the Academy of Motion Picture Arts and Sciences.  He was the first casting director to receive an Academy Award.  Two years later, the Casting Society of America began honoring entertainment professionals with the Lynn Stalmaster Award for Career Achievement. Recipients include Annette Bening, Laura Dern, and Geena Davis.

Stalmaster died on the morning of February 12, 2021, at his home in Los Angeles.  He was 93.

Partial filmography 

 Screaming Eagles, 1956
 Trooper Hook, 1957
 I Want to Live!, 1958
 Pork Chop Hill, 1959
 Inherit the Wind, 1960
 West Side Story, 1961
 Judgment at Nuremberg, 1961
 Two for the Seesaw, 1962
 A Child Is Waiting, 1963
 Toys in the Attic, 1963
 Lady in a Cage, 1964
 Kiss Me, Stupid, 1964
 The Greatest Story Ever Told, 1965
 The Hallelujah Trail, 1965
 A Rage to Live, 1965
 The Russians Are Coming, the Russians Are Coming, 1966
 The Fortune Cookie, 1966
 Return of the Seven, 1966
 Cast a Giant Shadow, 1966
 In the Heat of the Night, 1967
 Hour of the Gun, 1967
 Fitzwilly, 1967
 The Scalphunters, 1968
 The Thomas Crown Affair, 1968
 The Killing of Sister George, 1968
 The Stalking Moon, 1968
 Yours, Mine and Ours, 1968
 The Bridge at Remagen, 1969
 What Ever Happened to Aunt Alice?, 1969
 They Shoot Horses, Don't They?, 1969
 Viva Max, 1969
 Too Late the Hero, 1970
 They Call Me Mister Tibbs!, 1970
 Monte Walsh, 1970
 Lawman, 1971
 Valdez Is Coming, 1971
 The Grissom Gang, 1971
 Fiddler on the Roof, 1971
 Harold and Maude, 1971
 The Cowboys, 1972
 Pocket Money, 1972
 The Wrath of God, 1972
 Deliverance, 1972
 Junior Bonner, 1972
 Jeremiah Johnson, 1972
 The New Centurions, 1972
 The Mechanic, 1972
 The Life and Times of Judge Roy Bean, 1972
 Lolly-Madonna XXX, 1973
 Scorpio, 1973
 The Iceman Cometh, 1973
 The Last Detail, 1973
 Sleeper, 1973
 Cinderella Liberty, 1973
 Rhinoceros, 1974
 Billy Two Hats, 1974
 Conrack, 1974
 Mandingo, 1975
 Rollerball, 1975
 Silver Streak, 1976
 Bound for Glory, 1976
 Black Sunday, 1977
 New York, New York, 1977
 The Other Side of Midnight, 1977
 Coming Home, 1978
 The Fury, 1978
 Foul Play, 1978
 Go Tell the Spartans, 1978
 Convoy, 1978
 Superman, 1978
 Being There, 1979
 Stir Crazy, 1980
 Caveman, 1981
 First Blood, 1982
 Tootsie, 1982
 Airplane II: The Sequel, 1982
 The Right Stuff, 1983
 Supergirl, 1984
 Jagged Edge, 1985
 Santa Claus: The Movie, 1985
 9½ Weeks, 1986
 Spaceballs, 1987
 The Untouchables, 1987
 Weekend at Bernie's, 1989
 See No Evil, Hear No Evil, 1989
 Casualties of War, 1989
 Crazy People, 1990
 Teenage Mutant Ninja Turtles II: The Secret of the Ooze, 1991
 Stay Tuned, 1992
 Clifford, 1994
 To Gillian on Her 37th Birthday, 1996
 Battlefield Earth, 2000

References

External links 

 
 

1927 births
2021 deaths
Academy Honorary Award recipients
Beverly Hills High School alumni
American casting directors
Jewish American military personnel
Jews and Judaism in Omaha, Nebraska
Military personnel from Omaha, Nebraska
UCLA Film School alumni
United States Army soldiers
Writers from Omaha, Nebraska
Film people from Los Angeles
21st-century American Jews